Woodhouse Chocolate is an upscale chocolate shop in St. Helena, a city in Napa Valley, California. The shop is popular with celebrities such as Steven Spielberg. Founded by John Anderson, a former winemaker and graduate of Claremont McKenna College, and his wife chocolate chef Tracy Wood Anderson, a graduate of Scripps College.

The store was inspired by the movie Chocolat.

Customers 
 Vice President Dick Cheney
 Pierce Brosnan
 Priscilla Presley
 Star Jones
 Madonna (has packed samples in her guests' party bags)
 Kate Capshaw and husband Steven Spielberg

References

External links 
 
 In-depth article-- From Claremont McKenna College's "CMC" magazine

Chocolateries
Shops in the United States
St. Helena, California